"Don't Be So Shy" is a song by French singer Imany. The song was written by Imany and music by Nadia Mladjao (Imany) and Stéfane Goldman. A remixed version by Filatov & Karas became a pan-European and international hit for Imany and her biggest hit.

It was used in the soundtrack of the 2014 film Sous les jupes des filles (also known by the English title French Women) where two versions are used, one by Sherika Sherard and the other by Imany dubbed "Don't Be so Shy (Work in Progress)".

Filatov & Karas remix
In August 2015, the song was remixed by the Russian DJ duo Filatov & Karas. This version became a hit across Europe, topping the charts in Slovenia, Russia, Poland, France, Germany and Austria and charting highly on other European singles charts.

This version later appeared on Imany's album The Wrong Kind of War, which was released on 26 August 2016.

In 2022 Regard and Years & Years sampled a Filatov & Karas remix of Imany's single "Don't Be So Shy" in the song "Hallucination".

Don't Be So Shy Remixes
Imany also released a separate EP of remixes of the song.

Track listing
 "Don't Be So Shy" (Filatov & Karas Remix) – 3:10
 "Don't Be So Shy" (Ruslan Nigmatullin Remix) – 3:46
 "Don't Be So Shy" (Work in Progress)" – 3:02

Charts
"Don't Be So Shy" (Filatov & Karas Remix)

Weekly charts

Year-end charts

Certifications

See also
 List of Airplay 100 number ones of the 2010s

References

2014 songs
2015 singles
Songs written for films
Number-one singles in Austria
SNEP Top Singles number-one singles
Number-one singles in Germany
Number-one singles in Greece
Number-one singles in Poland
Number-one singles in Romania
Number-one singles in Russia